Mary MacGregor's Greatest Hits is an greatest hits album released in 1979 containing the singer's 1977 #1 hit "Torn Between Two Lovers" and a selection of other tracks from her two Ariola Records album releases as well the tracks from MacGregor's final Ariola single release "The Wedding Song (There Is Love)" and "Benjamin".  The album does not contain the singer's Top 40 hit from the Meatballs soundtrack: "Good Friend", which had been an RSO Records release.

Track listing 
Side One:
 "Torn Between Two Lovers" (Peter Yarrow, Peter Jarrell)
 "The Wedding Song (There Is Love)" (Noel Paul Stookey)
 "Memories" (David Bluefield, Marty Rodgers)
 "This Girl (Has Turned into a Woman)" (Peter Yarrow, Mary MacGregor)
 "Don't Let Me Be Lonely Tonight" (James Taylor)
 "In Your Eyes" (Amy Johnson)
Side Two:
 "I've Never Been to Me" (Ron Miller, Ken Hirsch)
 "For A While" (Peter Yarrow, Peter Jarrell)
 "Benjamin" (Mary MacGregor)
 "Hold Tight" (David Gates)
 "Alone Too Long" (Mark James, Cynthia Weil)
 "Just the Way You Are" (Billy Joel)

References

Mary MacGregor albums
Albums produced by Barry Beckett
1979 greatest hits albums
Ariola Records compilation albums